Toumpa is a village in Serres regional unit of Central Macedonia, Greece, located  southeast of Serres. Since 2011 it is a municipal unit of the municipality of Emmanouil Pappas and has a population of 576 inhabitants. The village bore the same name before 1928.

History

Antiquity
On the hillside of Phakistra, located very close to Toumpa, a lot of archaeological finds have been unearthed over time and between them two Greek inscriptions of Roman imperial times (2nd century AD). All these testifies to the existence of an ancient settlement with a continuous life from prehistoric to Byzantine times.

References

Populated places in Serres (regional unit)
Archaeological sites in Macedonia (Greece)
Macedonia (Greece)